New natural law (NNL) or new natural law theory (NNLT) is a school of Catholic thought based on natural law, developed by Germain Grisez and John Finnis from the 1960s.

References

Natural law